The Milk River Formation is a sandstone-dominated stratigraphic unit of the Western Canada Sedimentary Basin in southern Alberta, Canada. It was deposited in near-shore to coastal environments during Late Cretaceous (late Santonian to early Campanian) time. Based on uranium-lead dating, palynology and stratigraphic relationships, deposition occurred between ~84.1 and 83.6 Ma.

The sandstones of the Virgelle Member in the centre of the formation are well-exposed at Writing-on-Stone Provincial Park in southwestern Alberta, where they bear petroglyphs carved into them by First Nations people.

The formation is fossiliferous and has yielded an extensive vertebrate fauna (see Tables below), as well as fossil ammonites. In some areas it hosts shallow natural gas reservoirs.

Stratigraphy and lithology

The Milk River Formation is an eastward-thinning wedge of clastic sediments that was deposited along the western margin of the Western Interior Seaway during Late Cretaceous (late Santonian to early Campanian) time. It is age-equivalent to the marine shales of the Lea Park Formation in southeastern Alberta, and to the Eagle and Telegraph Creek Formations of north-central Montana.

In Alberta it is subdivided into the following three members:

Telegraph Creek Member, at the base, consists primarily of mudstones and shales deposited in offshore marine settings. It has produced the ammonite index fossil Desmoscaphites bassleri, which indicates an age of ~84. Ma.
Virgelle Member, the central member, is a sequence of massive, cliff-forming, yellow to white sandstones that were deposited in shoreface and tidal channel environments. It can be seen at Writing-on-Stone Provincial Park.
Deadhorse Coulee Member, at the top, consists of predominantly nonmarine shales, siltstones, sandstones, and coal beds that were deposited in rivers, floodplains and swamps. Most of the vertebrate fossils have come from this member.

Vertebrates
(references: Brinkman 2003; Gao and Fox 1995; Hilton and Grande 2006; Larson 2008; Sullivan 2003; University of Alberta webpage)

Cartilaginous fishes
Remains of an indeterminate lamnid genus and species are present.

Bony fishes
Remains of Acipenseridae, Amiidae, Esocidae, indeterminate genera and species.

Amphibians

Squamates
Indeterminate Anguidae and Xenosauridae genera and species.

Turtles
Indeterminate Solemydidae and Trionychidae genera and species.

Crocodilians

Dinosaurs
Indeterminate Ankylosauridae, Aves, Ceratopsidae, Dromaeosauridae, Hadrosauridae, Nodosauridae, Ornithomimidae, Pachycephalosauridae, Protoceratopsidae, Thescelosauridae, and Tyrannosauridae genera and species.

Mammals

Other mammals

Didelphomorphs

See also

 List of dinosaur-bearing rock formations

Footnotes

References
Brinkman, D. 2003. A review of nonmarine turtlesfrom the Late Cretaceous of Alberta. Canadian Journal of Earth Sciences 40:557-571.
Gao, K., Fox, R.C. 1996. Taxonomy and evolution of late Cretaceous lizards (Reptilia: Squamata) from Western Canada. Bulletin of the Carnegie Museum 33: 1-107.
Hilton, E.J. And Grande, L. 2006. Review of the fossil record of sturgeons, family Acipenseridae (Actinopterygii: Acipenseriformes), from North America. Journal of Paleontology 80: 672-683.
Larson, D.W. 2008. Diversity and variation of theropod dinosaur teeth from the uppermost Santonian Milk River Formation (Upper Cretaceous), Alberta: a quantitative method supporting identification of the oldest dinosaur tooth assemblage in Canada. Canadian Journal of Earth Sciences 45: 1455-1468.
Payenberg, T.H.D., Braman, D.R., Davis, D.W., and Miall, A.D. 2002. Litho- and chronostratigraphic relationships of the Santonian–Campanian Milk River Formation in southern Alberta and Eagle Formation in Montana utilising stratigraphy, U–Pb geochronology, and palynology. Canadian Journal of Earth Sciences 39:1553-1577.
Sullivan, R.M. 2003. Revision of the dinosaur Stegoceras Lambe (Ornithischia, Pachycephalosauridae). Journal of Vertebrate Paleontology 23: 181-207.
University of Alberta Museum https://web.archive.org/web/20090815182206/http://www.museums.ualberta.ca/dig/search/vpaleo/index.html

 
Geologic formations of Alberta
Cretaceous Alberta
Upper Cretaceous Series of North America